The following is a list of episodes for the British political satire and talk show The Last Leg which began airing on 30 August 2012 on Channel 4, originally as part of the channel's London 2012 Paralympic Games coverage and later spun off as its own show after the games finished. It is hosted by Adam Hills, Alex Brooker and Josh Widdicombe. Typical episodes are broadcast live with occasional, short prerecorded segments. The Last Leg Goes Down Under and the Christmas & New Year's Eve specials are fully prerecorded.

Series overview

Episodes
Episode ratings from BARB. All viewing figures from series 8 onwards include Channel 4 +1. All viewing figures from series 15 onwards include four-screen data.

2012

The Last Leg with Adam Hills
This series was broadcast during the 2012 Paralympic Games.

2013

Series 1

Note: Episode 8 was moved back a week because of Hawking being aired in its timeslot on 15 March 2013.

Series 2

2014

Series 3

Series 4

2015

Series 5

General election specials

Series 6

Stand Up to Cancer special

2016

Down Under

Series 7

Series 8

Live from Rio
During the 2016 Paralympics, broadcast nightly live from a studio in Rio de Janeiro, Brazil.

Series 9

2017

Series 10

Series 11

Series 12

2018

Series 13

Series 14

Series 15

2019

Series 16

Series 17

Series 18

2020

Series 19

Locked Down Under
Filmed from presenters’ and guests‘ separate houses with Hills at his home in Australia.

Series 20
This series was filmed without a live studio audience due to continued COVID-19 restrictions.

2021

Series 21
This series was filmed without a live studio audience due to continued COVID-19 restrictions.

Series 22
This series was filmed without a live studio audience due to continued COVID-19 restrictions.

The Last Leg of Tokyo 2020
This series aired nightly during the 2020 Paralympics, presented live from a studio near the London Stadium with correspondence from comedian Rosie Jones in Tokyo, Japan.

Series 23
This series saw the return of live audiences, but still adhering to the Covid rules.

2022

Series 24

Series 25

An episode set to air on 9 September 2022, with guests Richard Ayoade and Aisling Bea, was cancelled due to the death of Queen Elizabeth II.

Series 26

2023

Series 27

Notes

References

External links
List of 

Lists of British comedy television series episodes
Lists of British non-fiction television series episodes